Rangpur Sadar is an Upazila of Rangpur District in the Division of Rangpur, Bangladesh.

Geography
It has 89651 households and total area 330.33 km2.

The padas of Rangpur Sadar are Dhaap, Kamal Kasna, Robertsonganj, Mondolpara, Kuthirpara, Bahar Kasna, Munshipara, Mulatole Pada, Keranipara, Gomostapara, New Engineer Pada, Kotkipara, Deudoba Dangirpara, Palapara (also named Pakpara), Lalbagh. Mominpur is one of the unions in Rangpur sadar upazila.

Demographics
As of the 1991 Bangladesh census, Rangpur Sadar has a population of 494317. Males constitute 52.44% of the population, and females 47.56%. This Upazila's eighteen up population is 251530. Rangpur Sadar has an average literacy rate of 37.4% (7+ years), and the national average of 32.4% literate.

Administration
Rangpur Sadar Upazila is divided into Rangpur Municipality and 12 union parishads: Chandanpat, Darshana, Haridebpur, Mominpur, Pashuram, Rajendrapur, Sabyapushkarni, Satgra, Tamphat, Tapodhan, Uttam, and Rangpur Cantonment. The union parishads are subdivided into 151 mauzas and 308 villages.

See also
Upazilas of Bangladesh
Districts of Bangladesh
Divisions of Bangladesh

References

Upazilas of Rangpur District